Krabby is a populated place in Gislaved Municipality, Jönköping County, Sweden.

References

Populated places in Jönköping County